Kiran Juneja is an Indian actress who works in Hindi cinema.

Personal life

She is second wife of filmmaker Ramesh Sippy. She hails from Punjabi Bagh area of New Delhi, India and her father was a doctor.

Career
In 1984, she started her acting career by signing an Indo-Italian co-production film called Shaheen as the leading lady, followed by a serial called Paying Guest for Rajshree Films and Wah Janaab opposite Shekhar Suman. She went on to act in several serials such as Ye Jo Hai Zindagi, Kismat, Junoon, Siddhi, Banjara Guest House, Mouth Full of Sky, Waqt Ki Raftar, Swabhimaan, Gaatha, Palchin, Tere Ghar Ke Saamne with Raju Kher, Commander, Colonel, Tere Mere Sapne, Suraag, Kuch Love Kuch Masti, Koi Dil Me Hai and Sindoor Tere Naam Ka.

She is best known for her role of Ganga in Mahabharat and Verrawali in Buniyaad.

Filmography

Film

Television

Web series

Dubbing roles

References

External links

 
Kiran Juneja's Photo Gallery
Kiran Juneja

Living people
Indian film actresses
Actresses from New Delhi
Actresses in Hindi cinema
Indian television actresses
20th-century Indian actresses
21st-century Indian actresses
1964 births